The Contra Costa Community College District is a community college district that encompasses three community colleges in Contra Costa County, California - Contra Costa College, Diablo Valley College and Los Medanos College. The headquarters is in the George R. Gordon Education Center in Martinez, California.

Colleges
 Contra Costa College - San Pablo, California
 Diablo Valley College - Pleasant Hill, California
 San Ramon Valley Campus - San Ramon, California
 Los Medanos College - Pittsburg, California
 Brentwood Center - Brentwood, California

References

External links

Official website

California Community Colleges
Education in Contra Costa County, California
1949 establishments in California